Kerkbuurt may refer to a number of Dutch villages:

 Kerkbuurt, Andijk in North Holland, near Andijk
 Kerkbuurt, Marken in North Holland, on Marken
 Kerkbuurt, Schagen in North Holland
 Kerkbuurt, Schiedam in South Holland, near Schiedam